Croydon North by-election may refer to one of three parliamentary by-elections held in the British House of Commons constituency of Croydon North:

1940 Croydon North by-election
1948 Croydon North by-election
2012 Croydon North by-election

See also
Croydon North (UK Parliament constituency)